Abdulah Oruč (born 9 August 1955) is a Bosnian professional football manager and former player who is currently working as an assistant manager at Bosnian Premier League club Sarajevo.

Oruč started his career with Sarajevo, going on to play for numerous other clubs in the Yugoslav league system. So far, since 2003, he has worked at Sarajevo almost every year, with a break from 2008 to 2012.

Honours

Player
Napredak Kruševac
Yugoslav Second League: 1977–78 (East)

References

1955 births
Living people
Footballers from Sarajevo
Bosniaks of Bosnia and Herzegovina
Association football midfielders
Yugoslav footballers
FK Sarajevo players
FK Napredak Kruševac players
NK Bosna Visoko players
NK Rudar Velenje players
FK Radnik Hadžići players
Yugoslav First League players
Yugoslav Second League players
Bosnia and Herzegovina football managers
FK Radnik Hadžići managers